William Orville "Bill" Henrickson is a fictional character in the HBO series Big Love, portrayed by Bill Paxton. The protagonist of the series, he is the head of a polygamous family. He is married to three wives, Barbara Henrickson, Nicolette Grant and Margene Heffman. He has fathered nine children with these three women, and a tenth child with Ana.

Biography
Bill was born to Frank Harlow and Lois Henrickson at the Juniper Creek compound, a fictitious community that practices fundamentalist Mormon principles including polygamy. His grandfather, Orville Henrickson, was the prophet of Juniper Creek. His accountant was Roman Grant and they went out on a trip where Orville died under mysterious circumstances likely at the hands of Roman, who survived the crash. Roman Grant seized the power and the role of prophet shortly after Orville's death.

Bill spent most of his childhood in this community with his brother Joey and late sister Margaret, but at fourteen was thrown out of the compound by his father on instructions from Roman, who found Bill too much like his grandfather, and a potential threat to Grant's power. While attending college he met his first wife Barbara, who was a devout Mormon. Upon marrying her, he abandoned the principles of fundamentalist Mormonism and polygamy, and became a member of the Church of Jesus Christ of Latter-day Saints.

Soon after third child Tancy's birth, however, Barbara Henrickson was diagnosed with uterine cancer, from which she was expected to die. During her illness, Bill  met Nicolette Grant, the daughter of the Juniper Creek prophet Roman Grant, and brought her to his home. Nicolette helped to comfort Barbara while she was sick and care for her children, and it was decided that when Barbara died Nicolette was to marry Bill and raise their children. Barbara, however, recovered from her illness, and instead of abandoning Nicolette, Bill decided to return to the principle of polygamy and take her as his second wife. Nicki is mother to two of Bill's children, Raymond and Wayne.

Meanwhile, Bill's hardware business Henrickson's Home Plus was expanding. One employee of his store was Margene Heffman. Margene did not excel at doing her job, so Bill took her into his household as a babysitter. Soon, Bill fell in love with Margene, and took her as his third wife. Margene later gave birth to two sons, Aaron and Lester, and a daughter, Nell.

After marrying Margene, Bill moved his family to a set of three adjacent houses, connected by a common back yard, in Sandy, Utah, a suburb of Salt Lake City, and opened a second Henrickson Home Plus at a new location. Since moving, Bill has seen a number of problems, the main one being demands for a percentage of his income from  Roman Grant. In addition, he has had to deal with the problems of impotence and Nicolette's credit card debt, but has continued to love and protect his family.

In 2007 he and his business partner Don Embry decide to invest in slot machines, though this leads to a problem with another FLDS family, the Greenes. Both Roman and the head of the Greenes, Hollis Greene, fear that Bill is the next prophet. Bill arranges to turn state's evidence against the Greenes and go undercover for the FBI, as the Greenes are wanted for murder and extortion in Utah and in Mexico.

Bill's relationship with his three wives is complex. He would consider having an affair with another woman adulterous, but he does have a flirtation with a possible fourth wife. Bill claims he is completely in love with all three wives, and that he was moved by the Holy Spirit to choose them. Barb is head wife - the only legal marriage - and the one he can acknowledge in public. Margene and Nicki must say to others that they are single. Bill seems to argue the most with Nicki, who causes problems such as accidentally exposing their polygamy on several occasions, her credit card debt, and her jealous nature. However, he appreciates Nicki's unflinching devotion to the Principle. Bill's affections for Margene are in league with his affections for head wife Barb: she being the youngest and barely out of her teens, she has the largest sexual appetite (it is implied that Bill's sex life with his other two wives has dwindled considerably), she has the most child-bearing years left, and she causes the least trouble of all his wives (it's implied that she would cause more if she had a better understanding of the conflicts that surround the household, such as the atrocities between the compounds).  In the 2007 season finale, Barb tells him that she "outed" them to the neighbors as polygamous because Margene wanted to be a surrogate mother and Barb would not go along with that. Bill tells Barb that as his first wife he needs her the most and offers her membership on the board of the gaming company.

Season 3
Bill tries to attract partners for his casino business plan. The family continues to date Ana and tries to decide when and who should give birth to the next child. Bill gets an answer about the casino. Both Bill and Adaleen try to further their agenda with Rhonda. Lois is on the run and comes to Bill for help. Bill makes a proposition to Alby. The tension between Bill and Nicki reaches a head when Bill asks for the two to be unsealed.

Ana gives her answer to the family's proposal. She marries then divorces the family shortly after. Bill gets entangled with a collector who is trying to get a hold of a historical document Alby is selling.

In the season finale, Bill forms a new church following their exile from Juniper Creek and Barb's excommunication.

Season 4
With the grand opening of the Blackfoot Magic Casino only days away, the Henricksons make last-minute preparations under the skeptical eye of Tommy Flute, son of Billʼs partner Jerry.

In the 6th episode, it was revealed that Ana is pregnant and that she is also engaged. Bill finds out that his son Ben has romantic feeling for Margene and bans him from the house.

Season 5
It is revealed that Margene was 16 when they got married; she had lied that her age was 18. Barb, his first wife, struggles with her place within the newly formed church and demands a priesthood holder position that Bill cannot offer.  Nikki, his second wife, struggles with learning about an affair between her daughter Cara Lyn and her much older math teacher. Bill is shot in the series finale by his neighbor Carl after a dispute. With his dying words, Bill asks Barb to give him a blessing signifying his acceptance of her priesthood and respective place in the family. Nikki and Cara Lyn have a conversation that solidifies their relationship, while Margene fulfills her dream to travel to Central America and volunteer. Bill's 'ghost' is last seen sitting at the head of his dining room table watching his three wives.

See also
Mormon fundamentalism
Fundamentalist Church of Jesus Christ of Latter Day Saints
Warren Jeffs
Lost Boys of Polygamy

References 
Official HBO biography of Bill Henrickson

Big Love characters
Fictional businesspeople
Television characters introduced in 2006
Fictional American politicians
Fictional Democrats (United States)
Fictional characters from Utah
Fictional polyamorous characters